The Princeton University Summer Journalism Program (SJP) is an all-expense-paid summer program at Princeton University for rising high school seniors across the country from low-income backgrounds. It was founded in 2002 by four former 'Daily Princetonian' editors. The founding directors include former editor-in-chief of The Daily Princetonian, Richard Just (Princeton Class of 2001), former editor of The New Republic, Michael Koike '01, Gregory Mancini '01 and Rich Tucker '01.

The program is highly selective and open to outstanding students interested in journalism. Since it was founded, the program has graduated about 200 alumni who have gone on to pursue journalism at Ivy League and other highly selective schools including Princeton. Alumni have received jobs or internships at The New York Times, Newsweek, The Miami Herald, The New York Daily News, The Dallas Morning News, The Star-Ledger, NBC and CBS, among other outlets.

History

The Princeton University Summer Journalism Program was founded under the name "The Daily Princeton Class of 2001 Summer Journalism Program" in recognition of the founding of the program by 'Prince' editors from the Class of 2001. In 2006, it partnered with Princeton University and was renamed.

On November 11, 2009, the directors of the program were recognized as 'Tigers of the Week' by the Princeton Alumni Weekly. The program directors were also awarded the Princeton Alumni Award for Community Service in May 2007.

In January 2008, Richard Just wrote an article about the program in The Washington Post titled, Unmuzzling High School Journalists.

The creation of the program was sparked by a series the paper wrote about race on campus, the final one examining diversity within the newsroom at The Daily Princetonian.<ref>[http://www.dailyprincetonian.com/2002/09/12/5271/ Alumni of the program have gone on to write and edit for The Daily Princetonian]. "Summer program draws minorities to campus"</ref>

References

External links 
 The Princeton University Summer Journalism Program 
 The Daily Princetonian 
 Tigers of the Week 
 2002 Daily Princetonian Article: "Summer journalism program draws minorities to campus" 
 2005 Princeton Weekly Bulletin Article: "A once fledgling camp has grown" 
 2006 Princeton Weekly Bulletin Article: "Aspiring journalists learn the ropes from Princeton mentors" 
 2008 Washington Post article: "Unmuzzling High School Journalists" 

American journalism organizations
Internship programs
Summer Journalism Program
Recurring events established in 2002
2002 establishments in New Jersey